300 series may refer to:

Japanese train types
 300 Series Shinkansen
 Chichibu Railway 300 series electric multiple unit
 Choshi Electric Railway 300 series electric multiple unit
 HB-E300 series hybrid diesel multiple unit
 JR Freight Class HD300 hybrid diesel locomotive
 Meitetsu 300 series electric multiple unit
 Tobu 300 series electric multiple unit

Computer hardware
 ThinkPad 300 series, a line of laptop computers

Consumer graphics cards
 Radeon Rx 300 series
 GeForce 300 Series

Other
 Kodak DCS 300 series digital camera
 Rickenbacker 300 Series guitar
 Volvo 300 Series car
 300 series, or austenitic stainless steel

See also
 Series 3 (disambiguation)
 300 (disambiguation)
 3000 series (disambiguation)